José Francisco Correia da Serra (6 June 1750 – 11 September 1823) was a Portuguese Abbot, polymath – philosopher, diplomat, politician and scientist.<ref>Diogo, Maria Paula Diogo, Ana Carneiro1 and Ana Simões. "The Portuguese naturalist Correia da Serra (1751–1823) and his impact on early nineteenth-century botany," Journal of the History of Biology." (June 2001) 34:2, 353–393.</ref> In some circumstances, he was also known as Abbé Correa. The plant genus Correa, native to Australia, is named in his honour.

Biography
Correia da Serra was born at Serpa, in Alentejo, in 1750, and was educated at Rome, where he took holy orders. In 1777 he returned to Lisbon, where he was one of the founders of the Academia das Ciências de Lisboa in 1779 (then called Academia Real das Ciências de Lisboa; Royal Academy of Sciences of Lisbon).

His published writings brought him into conflict with reactionary members of the religious and political hierarchy in Portugal.

In 1786, he fled to France, and remained there till the death of Portuguese King-consort Pedro III, when he again returned to his homeland, but political difficulties forced him to leave the country again. He went to England, where he found a protector in Sir Joseph Banks, who was President of the Royal Society. With Banks' support, he was easily elected a fellow of the society. In 1797, he was elected a foreign member of the Royal Swedish Academy of Sciences.

In 1797, he was appointed secretary to the Portuguese embassy in London, but a quarrel with the ambassador prompted him to leave.  He accompanied the Polish military leader Thaddeus Kosciusko and the Polish poet Julian Ursyn Niemcewicz to the United States, sailing on the ship Adriana from Bristol; the trio reached Philadelphia on 18 August 1797. He eventually returned to Paris 1802, and stayed there for the next eleven years. In 1812, he was elected as a member to the American Philosophical Society.

In 1813, he left Europe for the New World once again, arriving first in New York City.  He settled in Philadelphia where he delivered lectures on botany at the University of Pennsylvania. His travels took him several times to Monticello, the home of former President Thomas Jefferson where his political views found a fulsome reception. He was elected a Foreign Honorary Member of the American Academy of Arts and Sciences in 1815.

In 1816, he was made Portuguese minister-plenipotentiary at Washington D.C., but resided in Philadelphia.

In 1820, he was recalled home to Portugal, where he was appointed a member of the financial council, and elected to a seat in the "General Extraordinary and Constituent Cortes of the Portuguese Nation", but he died only three years later.

WorksColecção de livros inéditos da história Portuguesa, 4 vols., 1790–1816.

Articles:
 "On the fructification of the submersed Algae," Philosophical Transactions, 1799, pp. 494–505.
 "On a submarine forest on the coast of England," Philosophical Transactions, 1799, pp. 145–155.
 "On two genera of plants belonging to the natural family of the Aurantia," Transactions of the Linnean Society, Vol. 5, pp. 218–226.
 "On the Doryantha, a new genius of plants from New Holland next akin to the Agave," Transactions of the Linnean Society, 6, pp. 211–213.
 "Observations sur la famille des oranges et sur les limites qui la circonscrivent," Annales du Muséum d'Histoire Naturelle, 6, pp. 376–386.
 "Mémoire sur la germination du nelumbo," Annales du Muséum d'Histoire naturelle, 13, 174.
 "Vues Carpologiques/Observations Carpologiques," Annales du Muséum d'Histoire Naturelle, 8, 9, 10.
 "Mémoire sur la valeur du périsperme, considerée comme caractère d'affinité des plantes", Bulletin de la Société Philomatique, 11, 350.
 "De l'état des Sciences, et des lettres en Portugal, à la fin du dixhuitième siècle," Archives litteraires de l'Europe, Vol. I, 1804.
 "Sur l'agriculture des arabes en Espagne", Archives Littéraires de l'Europe, 2, pp. 239–404.
 "Observations and conjectures on the formation and nature of the soil of Kentucky," Transactions of the American Philosophical Society, Philadelphia, 1811.
 "Considerations générales sur l'etat passé et futur de l'Europe," The American Review'', 1812.

See also
 Royal Society—Correia da Serra was elected to membership in the Society in 1795; and his nomination letter has been posted with other membership records at the Royal Society web site – here.  Those signing his Certificate of Election and Candidature were: James Edward Smith, 	Aylmer Bourke Lambert, Edward Whitaker Gray, Maxwell Garthshore, Samuel Solly, James Rennell and William Marsden.

References

Attribution:

External links
 The Royal Society website

1750 births
1823 deaths
People from Serpa
Portuguese Roman Catholic priests
Portuguese abbots
Portuguese diplomats
Portuguese philosophers
Portuguese politicians
Portuguese scientists
18th-century Portuguese botanists
Portuguese essayists
Ambassadors of Portugal to the United States
Fellows of the American Academy of Arts and Sciences
Fellows of the Royal Society
18th-century Portuguese writers
19th-century Portuguese writers
19th-century male writers
19th-century Portuguese politicians
Members of the Lisbon Academy of Sciences
19th-century Portuguese botanists